Chocolate Eclair is a Canadian drama film from Quebec, directed by Jean-Claude Lord and released in 1979.

The film centres on Pierre (Jean Belzil-Gascon), a young boy struggling to accept that his single mother Marie-Louise (Lise Thouin) has begun a new relationship after the death of his father. What he does not know is that his mother has lied to protect him: his real father is not dead, but in fact he is the offspring of Marie-Louise having been raped by her father. The film's cast also includes Jean-Louis Roux, Colin Fox, Michèle Deslauriers and Aubert Pallascio.

The film garnered three Genie Award nominations at the 1st Genie Awards in 1980, in the categories of Best Adapted Screenplay (Lord and Jean Salvy), Best Costume Design (François Barbeau) and Best Sound Editing (Marcel Pothier).

Plot
After she had been raped by her father, a young woman leaves the town with her new born son. Years later, the son can't accept that his mother fell in love with someone else than the mythical father she had told him about.

References

External links 
 
 

1979 films
Canadian coming-of-age drama films
Incest in film
Films directed by Jean-Claude Lord
1970s French-language films
French-language Canadian films
1970s Canadian films
1970s coming-of-age drama films